A choir, also sometimes called quire, is the area of a church or cathedral that provides seating for the clergy and church choir. It is in the western part of the chancel, between the nave and the sanctuary, which houses the altar and Church tabernacle. In larger medieval churches it contained choir-stalls, seating aligned with the side of the church, so at right-angles to the seating for the congregation in the nave. Smaller medieval churches may not have a choir in the architectural sense at all, and they are often lacking in churches built by all denominations after the Protestant Reformation, though the Gothic Revival revived them as a distinct feature.

As an architectural term "choir" remains distinct from the actual location of any singing choir – these may be located in various places, and often sing from a choir-loft, often over the door at the liturgical western end. In modern churches, the choir may be located centrally behind the altar, or the pulpit.

The back-choir or retroquire is a space behind the high altar in the choir of a church, in which there may be a small altar standing back to back with the other.

History

In the Early Church, the sanctuary was connected directly to the nave. The choir was simply the east part of the nave, and was fenced off by a screen or low railing, called cancelli, which is where the English word chancel comes from. The development of the architectural feature known as the choir is the result of the liturgical development brought about by the end of persecutions under Constantine the Great and the rise of monasticism. The word "choir" is first used by members of the Latin Church. Isidore of Seville and Honorius of Autun write that the term is derived from the "corona", the circle of clergy or singers who surrounded the altar.

When first introduced, the choir was attached to the bema, the elevated platform in the center of the nave on which were placed seats for the higher clergy and a lectern for scripture readings. This arrangement can still be observed at the Basilica of St. Mary Major in Rome. Over time, the bema (or presbytery) and choir moved eastward to their current position. In some churches, such as Westminster Cathedral, the choir is arranged in the apse behind the altar.

The architectural details of the choir developed in response to its function as the place where the Divine Office was chanted by the monastic brotherhood or the chapter of canons. The chancel was regarded as the clergy's part of the church, and any choirboys from a choir school counted as part of the clergy for this purpose. After the Reformation, when the number of clergy present even in large churches and cathedrals tended to reduce, and lay singing choirs became more frequent, there were often objections to placing them in the traditional choir stalls in the chancel. The pulpit and lectern are also usually found at the front of the choir, though both Catholic and Protestant churches have sometimes moved the pulpit to the nave for better audibility. The organ may be located here, or in a loft elsewhere in the church. Some cathedrals have a retro-choir behind the High Altar, opening eastward towards the chapels (chantries) in the eastern extremity.

After the Reformation Protestant churches generally moved the altar (now often called the communion table) forward, typically to the front of the chancel, and often used lay choirs who were placed in a gallery at the west end. The choir and rear of deep chancels became little used in churches surviving from the Middle Ages, and new churches very often omitted one. With the emphasis on sermons, and their audibility, some churches simply converted their chancels to seat part of the congregation. In 19th-century England one of the battles of the Cambridge Camden Society, the architectural wing of the Anglo-Catholics in the Church of England, was to restore the chancel, including the choir, as a necessary part of a church. By pushing the altar back to its medieval position and having the choir used by a lay choir, they were largely successful in this, although the harder end of the High Church objected to allowing a large group of laity into the chancel. Different approaches to worship in the 20th century again tended to push altars in larger churches forward, to be closer to the congregation, and the chancel again risks being a less used area of the church.

Seating

The choir area is occupied by sometimes finely carved and decorated wooden seats known as choir stalls, where the clergy sit, stand or kneel during services. The choir may be furnished either with long benches (pews) or individual choir stalls. There may be several rows of seating running parallel to the walls of the church.

The use of choir stalls (as opposed to benches) is more traditional in monasteries and collegiate churches. Monastic choir stalls are often fitted with seats that fold up when the monastics stand and fold down when they sit. Often the hinged seat will have a misericord (small wooden seat) on the underside on which he can lean while standing during the long services. The upper part of the monk's stall is so shaped as to provide a headrest while sitting, and arm rests when standing. Monasteries will often have strict rules as to when the monastics may sit and when they must stand during the services.

Choir benches are more common in parish churches. Each bench may have padded kneelers attached to the back of it so that the person behind may kneel at the appropriate times during services. The front row will often have a long prie-dieu running in front of it for the choir members to place their books on, and which may also be fitted with kneelers.

In a cathedral, the bishop's throne or cathedra is usually located in this space.

Image gallery

See also 

Cathedral architecture
Cathedral floorplan
Kathisma
Kliros
Matroneum

References

External links

 
Choir and Retro-Choir at Southwark Cathedral

Church architecture

pl:Stalle